Hill usually refers to a raised landform.

Hill may also refer to:

Places

England
Hill, Gloucestershire
Hill, Warwickshire
Hill, West Midlands

United States
Hill, New Hampshire
Hill, Wisconsin
Fort A.P. Hill, a U.S. Army facility near Bowling Green, Virginia
Hill Air Force Base, a U.S. Air Force facility near Ogden, Utah

Elsewhere
Hill, Netherlands, a hamlet in the municipality of Altena, North Brabant
Hill (stream), a 25-km-long stream that rises in the Eifel mountains, in Belgium
Hill Island, Nunavut, Canada
Electoral district of Hill, of the Legislative Assembly of Queensland, Australia

People and fictional characters
 Hill (surname), a list of people and fictional characters
 Hill Harper (born 1966), American actor and author
 Hill Zaini (born 1987), Bruneian recording artist and actor
 Hill H. Wilson (1840-1896), American businessman and politician

Other uses
 Embassy Hill, a 1970s Formula One team
"Hills", a 2017 song by Kim Petras

See also

 
 
 Hills (disambiguation)
 The Hill (disambiguation)
 The Hills (disambiguation)
 Hilly (disambiguation)
 Hillies (disambiguation)
 Hill City (disambiguation)
 Hill County (disambiguation)
 Hill Township (disambiguation)
 Hillfield (disambiguation), including Hill Field(s)
 Hillyfields (disambiguation), including Hilly Field(s)
 Mountain (disambiguation)
 Mount (disambiguation)